Markovo is a rural locality (a selo) in Markovsky Selsoviet of Blagoveshchensky District, Amur Oblast, Russia. The population was 1,327 as of 2018. There are 12 streets.

Geography 
Markovo is located on the left bank of the Amur River, 39 km north of Blagoveshchensk (the district's administrative centre) by road. Mikhaylovka is the nearest rural locality.

References 

Rural localities in Blagoveshchensky District, Amur Oblast